10 on Broadway is a studio album of Broadway standards from Dennis DeYoung. It was released in 1994 by Atlantic Records.  The idea for the album came in connection with DeYoung's performance as Pontius Pilate in Jesus Christ Superstar as part of the 1992 national tour of the production.

Track listing

References

1994 albums
Dennis DeYoung albums
Atlantic Records albums
Covers albums